Lance John Edward Armstrong (born 17 February 1940) is an Australian former politician. Born in Perth, Western Australia, he was active in Tasmania and is currently a minister with the Uniting Church in Albury.

Political career 

In 1989, Armstrong was elected, together with Christine Milne, Di Hollister, and incumbents Gerry Bates and Bob Brown, to the Tasmanian House of Assembly for Bass as a member of a group of independents under the leadership of Bob Brown, after a community backlash against a proposed paper pulp mill near Devonport.  They together formed an alliance called the Green Independents, and held the balance of power in the government for three years, keeping Michael Field's minority Labor Party government in power in an arrangement called the Labor–Green Accord.

The state election of 1992 saw all five sitting Greens re-elected, but with a drop in their vote of around 25% and with a majority Liberal government in power. After the election, these independents were reconstituted as the Tasmanian Greens. However, they still operated akin to independents, as the Tasmanian Greens had adopted the policy of allowing parliamentary members a "conscience vote" on all issues.

In April, Armstrong introduced a bill to restrict advertising and display of publications. This bill was aimed at the display of publications such as People and Playboy in newsagents, which Armstrong argued were degrading to women, although magazine Green Left Weekly argued that "Armstrong's censorship legislation is likely to increase the climate of repressiveness around sexuality".

At the 1996 election, four Greens were returned and the Greens achieved the balance of power with a Liberal minority government, but Armstrong lost his seat of Bass.

After politics 
Armstrong is currently a Uniting Church minister in Albury-Wodonga.

In 2008, he controversially distributed a flyer urging residents not to vote for Henk van de Ven in Albury's local government elections, accusing van de Ven of "forceful and belligerent behaviour" in relation to an occasional child-care centre being built on council parkland.

References 

1940 births
Living people
Australian Greens members of the Parliament of Tasmania
Members of the Tasmanian House of Assembly
Uniting Church in Australia ministers
Politicians from Perth, Western Australia